The following is a list of Eastern Washington Eagles men's basketball head coaches. There have been 19 head coaches of the Eagles in their 114-season history.

Eastern Washington's current head coach is David Riley. He was hired as the Eagles' head coach in March 2021, replacing Shantay Legans, who left to become the head coach at Portland.

References

Eastern Washington

Eastern Washington Eagles men's basketball coaches